The 1509 Constantinople earthquake or historically  ('Minor Judgment Day') occurred in the Sea of Marmara on 10 September 1509 at about 10 p.m. A tsunami and forty-five days of aftershocks followed the earthquake. The death toll of this earthquake is poorly known, with estimates in the range of 1,000 to 13,000.

Background
The Sea of Marmara is a pull-apart basin formed at a releasing bend in the North Anatolian Fault, a right-lateral strike-slip fault. This local zone of extension occurs where this transform boundary between the Anatolian Plate and the Eurasian Plate steps northwards to the west of Izmit from the Izmit Fault to the Ganos Fault. The pattern of faults within the Sea of Marmara basin is complex but near Istanbul there is a single main fault segment with a sharp bend. To the west, the fault trends west–east and is pure strike-slip in type. To the east, the fault is NW-SE trending and shows evidence of both normal and strike-slip motion. Movement on this fault, which bounds the Çınarcık Basin, was the most likely cause of the 1509 event.

Damage

The area of significant damage (greater than VII (Very strong)) extended from Çorlu in the west to Izmit in the east. Galata and Büyükçekmece also suffered severe damage. In Constantinople 109 mosques were utterly destroyed, while most of those left standing suffered damage to their minarets. While 1070 homes collapsed, 49 towers along the Walls of Constantinople also collapsed or were damaged. The newly built Bayezid II Mosque was badly damaged; the main dome was destroyed and a minaret collapsed. The Fatih Mosque suffered damage to its four great columns and the dome was split. The quake also damaged the Rumeli Fortress, Anadolu Fortress, the Yoros Castle in Anadolu Kavağı, and the Maiden's Tower. The Grand Mosque of Hagia Sophia survived almost unscathed, although a minaret collapsed. Inside the mosque, the plaster that had been used to cover up the Byzantine mosaics inside the dome fell off, revealing the Christian images.

The number of dead and injured is hard to estimate, with different sources giving accounts varying from 1,000 to 13,000. It is believed that some members of the Ottoman dynasty died in this earthquake. Aftershocks continued for 45 days after the earthquake, and people were unable to return to their homes for two months. Ottoman Turks felt that doomsday had arrived. Indeed, the quake was so destructive for Constantinople that historians referred to it as “Kıyamet-i Sugra” or “Little Doomsday.”

Aftermath

The earthquake was allegedly predicted by an unnamed Greek monk from Saint Catherine's Monastery in Sinai while present in the Sultan's court. European interpretations at the time viewed the earthquake as a sort of punishment, a punishment from God set upon the Turks for taking up arms against European Christians. Similarly, Sultan Bayezid II saw it as a punishment from God, however he attributed the punishment to the wrongdoings of his ministers. The sultan's residence Topkapı Palace was not damaged but Bayezid II's bedroom collapsed at the tremor, with the sultan only saved by the fact he had left his chambers only hours earlier. After staying for ten days in a tent set up in the palace garden, Bayezid II went to stay in former capital of Edirne.

The Ottoman Imperial Council (Divan-ı Hümayun) convened after the quake and made decisions to deal with the effects of the disaster. Constantinople had to be reconstructed and an additional tax of 22 akçe would be taken from each household for the task, it was decided. Afterward, an empire-wide initiative was launched to reconstruct the city. Tens of thousands of workers, stonemasons and carpenters were brought to Istanbul from both Anatolia and Rumelia. Beginning on March 29, 1510, construction works in the city were undergone hastily and completed on June 1, 1510.

Characteristics

Earthquake
From the area and intensity of shaking, a  fault rupture has been estimated. Major shocks occurred at half-hour intervals and were violent and protracted in nature, forcing residents to seek refuge in open parks and squares. Aftershocks were said to have continued for 18 days without causing any further damage, however, it did delay reconstruction in some areas.

Tsunami
A turbidite bed whose deposition matches the date of the earthquake has been recognised in the Çınarcık Basin.

See also
List of earthquakes in Turkey
List of historical earthquakes

References

Constantinople
Earthquakes in Turkey
16th century in Istanbul
1509 in science
1509 in Europe
1509 in Asia
1509 in the Ottoman Empire
Constantinople
Sea of Marmara